Wilford is a surname. Notable people with the surname include:

 Aron Wilford (born 1982), English footballer
 Ernest Wilford (born 1979), American football player
 Francis Wilford (1761–1822), Hanoverian Indologist and Orientalist
 Sir James Wilford (1516–1550), English soldier
 John Wilford (MP) (died 1418), English politician
 John Wilford (fl.1723–1742), English bookseller
 John Noble Wilford (born 1933), American journalist
 Mark Wilford (born 1959), American climber
 Marty Wilford (born 1977), Canadian ice hockey player
 Michael Wilford (born 1938), English 
 Ronald A. Wilford (1927–2015), American music manager 
 Sara Wilford (born 1932), American psychologist
 Sir Thomas Wilford (1870–1939), New Zealand politician
 William Wilford (died 1413), English politician

See also
Willeford

 Includes any persons with "Wilford" as first name